Fifteen species of reptiles are native within the U.S. state of Arkansas, in the south-central United States.

Lizards
Twelve species of lizard are native to the state. The most common lizards are skinks, there are six native Scincidae species.

The Western Slender Glass Lizard (Ophisaurus attenuatus attenuatus) is also native to the state.

See also

References

Reptiles
Arkansas